Resupuvanipalem  is a neighborhood in Visakhapatnam, Andhra Pradesh, India.

About
Resupuvanipalem is one of the major commercial and residential suburbs in Visakhapatnam located to the west of Bay of Bengal. The Visakhapatnam BRTS Road connects Resupuvanipalem to Asilmetta and Dwaraka Nagar. Resupuvanipalem was an initially a small suburb between Asilmetta and Maddilapalem. One of the biggest indoor stadiums of Visakhapatnam  Swarna Bharathi Indoor Stadium is located here.

Commerce
The shopping area is good with corner grocery stores and others. Spencers market, reliance mart and many other shops are located here.

Institutes
 Dr.L.Bullayya College

Transport
The buses run by APSRTC connect Resupuvanipalem to all parts of the city.

References

Neighbourhoods in Visakhapatnam